Zooman Sam (1999) is a children's novel by Lois Lowry. It is part of a series that Lowry wrote about Anastasia and her younger brother Sam.

Plot summary

It's Future Job Day at Sam's nursery school, and Sam, who has zookeeping aspirations, is thrilled when his teacher says he can tell the other children about a series of zoo animals: "For six weeks he could stand in front of the circle and feel that feeling of being the most interesting person in the room."

As always, the patient and loving Krupnik family stands by as Anastasia's irrepressible little brother struggles with a set of almost impossible goals.

Reception 
Kirkus Reviews finds that "The plotting is leisurely, the story is slender, and a subplot about the training of the family dog barely registers." and "... the material runs out of steam before the novel ends." but "Fans of the Sam books may find satisfaction in the nicely foreshadowed but still unanticipated punch line."  Rob Reid spoke positively "It's a hilarious scene that will have the elementary-age crowd laughing."

References

External links 

Description  of the book from Lowry's website.
Lowry's website
Complete list of books by Lowry

2001 American novels
2001 children's books
American children's novels
Novels by Lois Lowry
Children's novels about animals